Maria Mercedes is a 2013 Philippine romantic drama loosely based on the 1992 Mexican telenovela of the same title produced by Televisa starring Thalía and Arturo Peniche. It is topbilled by Jessy Mendiola, Jake Cuenca and Jason Abalos. The series was aired on ABS-CBN's Primetime Bida evening block and worldwide on The Filipino Channel from October 7, 2013 to January 24, 2014, replacing Muling Buksan ang Puso.

Cast and characters

Main cast
 Jessy Mendiola as Maria Mercedes Alegre
 Jake Cuenca as Luis Sancuevas
 Jason Abalos as Clavio Mondejar

Supporting cast
 Vina Morales as Magnolia Alegre
 Ariel Rivera as Santiago del Olmo
 Nikki Gil as Misty Delaver
 Vivian Velez as Malvina Sancuevas
 Nadia Montenegro as Filomena Mondejar
 Atoy Co as Oscar Mondejar
 Marx Topacio as Guillermo Alegre
 Devon Seron as Rosario Alegre
 Isabella de Leon as Digna Sancuevas
 Yogo Singh as Andres Alegre
 Alex Castro as Anthony Figueras
 Twinkle Dy as Twinkle
 Tess Antonio as Sylvia "Ibyang" 
 Sharmaine Suarez as Daisy Torrecampo
 Via Veloso  as Susan Mendez
 Simon Ibarra as Cordelio Capili
 Jerry O'Harra as Dr. Carlos Buenafe

Extended cast
 Shey Bustamante as Emery
 Peter Serrano as Enrique
 Phoemela Barranda as Yvette
 Carlo Romero as Jacob
 Crispin Pineda as Mang  Ben
 Jovic Monsod as Basti
 Erika Padilla as Lou
 Vangie Martelle as Shane
 Benjamin De Guzman as Edwin
 Archie Alemania as Rex
 Zeppi Borromeo as Mac
 Jose Sarasola as Gio
 Jaycee Parker as Frances
 Mike Lloren as Roi

Guest cast
 Lollie Mara as Doña Carmen
 Diana Hughes as Vanessa
 Pontri as Alvaro - husband of Malvina
Beauty Gonzalez as Edna
Paul Jake Castillo as Adam 
 Ynna Asistio as Eula

Special participation
 Tetchie Agbayani as Bettina Delaver
 Jeffrey Santos as Bodjie
 Dominic Ochoa as Manuel Alegre
 Alexa Ilacad as young Mercedes
 Carlo Lacana as young Luis
 John Bermundo as young Clavio
 Belle Mariano as young Rosario
 John Manalo as young Guillermo

Soundtrack
 Maria Mercedes - Jessy Mendiola
 Siege Towers (No Choir) - Audiomachine
 María Mercedes - Thalía

Reception

See also
List of programs broadcast by ABS-CBN
List of ABS-CBN drama series
María Mercedes (Mexican TV series)

References

External links
 

ABS-CBN drama series
Philippine romance television series
2013 Philippine television series debuts
2014 Philippine television series endings
Philippine television series based on telenovelas
Philippine television series based on Mexican television series
Filipino-language television shows
Television shows set in the Philippines